The  is a JMA  located in Naha, Okinawa. It is responsible for weather services in Okinawa region and operates three Local Meteorological Observatories as well as an Aviation Weather Station.

History 
1887 - The  was established.
1924 - The whole building of observatory burned down and all of the observational records got lost.
1939 - Renamed to the 
August 11, 1945 - Demoted to the 
November 13, 1946 - Okinawa Weather Station was abolished.
January 1950 - The  was established.
April 1950 - 
August 1, 1965 - Reorganized into an agency of the  after the Reform of the Government of the Ryukyu Islands.
1987 - Having moved to the present building.

External links 
 Okinawa Meteorological Observatory 
 Miyakojima Local Meteorological Observatory 
 Ishigakijima Local Meteorological Observatory 
 Minamidaitoujima Local Meteorological Observatory 
 Naha Aviation Weather Station 

Japan Meteorological Agency